Natalie Zeleznikar (born September 9, 1966) is an American politician serving in the Minnesota House of Representatives since 2023. A member of the Republican Party of Minnesota, Zeleznikar represents District 3B in northern Minnesota, which includes the city of Hermantown, Two Harbors and Rice Lake and parts of Lake and St. Louis Counties.

Early life, education and career 
Zeleznikar grew up on a farm in St. Francis, Minnesota and attended college at the University of Wisconsin-Eau Claire, receiving a bachelor's degree in Health Administration. She has worked for 30 years in health care administration.

Minnesota House of Representatives 
Zeleznikar was first elected to the Minnesota House of Representatives in 2022, defeating DFL incumbent Mary Murphy by 35 votes. According to Minnesota state election law, an automatic recount occurred, after which Zeleznikar was declared the winner by 33 votes.

Zeleznikar serves on the Children and Families Finance and Policy, Human Services Finance, and Workforce Development Finance and Policy Committees.

Electoral history

Personal life 
Zeleznikar lives in Duluth, Minnesota with her husband, Dan and their two children. She is Lutheran and attends Peace in Christ Lutheran Church in Hermantown, Minnesota.

References

External links 

Living people
1966 births
21st-century American politicians
21st-century American women politicians
Republican Party members of the Minnesota House of Representatives
University of Wisconsin–Eau Claire alumni
People from St. Francis, Minnesota
People from Duluth, Minnesota